Donald Melville (1829 – 20 March 1919) was a Scottish-born Australian politician.

He was born in Aberdeen and christened on 19 November 1829; his parents were Donald Melville and Margaret Jolly. He worked as a clerk, but later migrated to Victoria where he was a wool store traveller. Around 1871 he became an auctioneer at Brunswick; in that year he also married Kate Mackay, with whom he had five daughters. He established D. Melville and Company around 1874, a firm of wool and grain brokers and auctioneers in Melbourne. He served on Brunswick Municipal Council from 1878 to 1884 and was mayor from 1881 to 1882. In 1882 he was elected to the Victorian Legislative Council for Southern Province. He was Minister of Defence and Minister of Health from 1899 to 1900. In 1904 he transferred to Melbourne North Province, and served until his death in Brunswick in 1919.

References

1829 births
1919 deaths
Members of the Victorian Legislative Council